This list of University of New Mexico buildings catalogs the currently-existing UNM-owned structures that reside within the Albuquerque metropolitan area, the home of the university's main campus.

Table of University of New Mexico buildings in the Albuquerque metropolitan area
Buildings in the sortable table below are initially listed alphabetically.

Future buildings

Former buildings

References

External links
  Campus Map: Planning and Campus Development

University of New Mexico
Buildings and structures in Albuquerque, New Mexico
New Mexico, University of
University of New Mexico